The  was an infantry division in the Imperial Japanese Army. It was formed in China as triangular division from the independent mixed brigade and other units 21 June 1938

Action
4 July 1938 the 27th division was assigned to 11th Army. From the 25 July 1938, the division has started to participate in the Battle of Wuhan. After the end of battle in October 1938, the 27th division was sent to the staging grounds in Tianjin, where it was subordinated directly to the China Expeditionary Army in September 1939.

17 June 1943 the division was moved out of reserve and ordered to garrison Jinzhou. The division was mobilized 1 February 1944 for the tentative participation in the Operation Ichi-Go, and transferred back to the 11th Army 17 March 1944. As the Operation Ichi-Go has started 17 April 1944, the 27th division has attacked Queshan County 9 May 1944. 30 January 1945 the 27th division has also captured an important airfield in Jiangxi. Afterward, while being in Ganzhou, the 27th division was subordinated to the 23rd Army and sent to Guangdong, providing a coastal defence to Huizhou.

After the Battle of Okinawa started, the 27th division 18 April 1945 had received orders to retreat to Shanghai through Nanchang. The division was in Wuxi at the moment of surrender of Japan 15 August 1945.

See also
 List of Japanese infantry divisions

Reference and further reading

 Madej, W. Victor. Japanese Armed Forces Order of Battle, 1937-1945 [2 vols] Allentown, PA: 1981
 This article incorporates material from the Japanese Wikipedia page 第27師団 (日本軍), accessed 8 March 2016

Japanese World War II divisions
Infantry divisions of Japan
Military units and formations established in 1938
Military units and formations disestablished in 1945
1938 establishments in Japan
1945 disestablishments in Japan